Michael Cusack (born 7 November 1984 in Doncaster, England) is a British former international rugby union player who last played for Yorkshire Carnegie. His usual position is at tighthead prop. He has previously played for Glasgow Warriors, Newcastle Falcons and Doncaster Knights.

Rugby Union career

Professional career

He started with Leeds Tykes. From Leeds, he signed for Doncaster Knights at the end of the 2007–08 season.

Cusack moved to Glasgow Warriors in the summer of 2011.

After 48 matches for the Warriors spanning five seasons, Cusack signed for Newcastle Falcons on 1 March 2016 He played 4 matches for the Falcons in the Aviva Premiership, making 2 starts and 2 sub appearances.

On the 10 June 2016 it was announced that Cusack signed with Yorkshire Carnegie on a 2-year deal. He made his final appearance against London Irish in the Championship play off final in May 2017. Cusack missed the 2017-18 season through a neck injury which led to him announcing his retirement from rugby in January 2018.

International career

He played for England under-19s and under-21s.

After being resident in Scotland for over three-years he became eligible for Scotland internationally. He was called up as part of Scotland's extended training squad for the 2015 Rugby World Cup by head coach Vern Cotter on 2 June 2015

Named on the bench for the Ireland versus Scotland match he replaced Jon Welsh at 46 minutes to earn his first full Scotland cap and thus confirm his Scottish nationality 

He then made his first start for Scotland against Italy in Turin on the 22 August 2015.

References

External links
 Glasgow Warriors
 Doncaster profile
 Leeds profile

1984 births
Living people
Scotland international rugby union players
Doncaster R.F.C. players
British rugby union players
Leeds Tykes players
Rugby union players from Doncaster
Glasgow Warriors players
Rugby union props
Newcastle Falcons players